Arthur Köpcke (Born 1928 in Hamburg - Died 1977 in Copenhagen) (aka Arthur Køpcke), was a German-born artist known for his contributions to the first generation of Fluxus. Köpcke’s work includes paintings, scrolls, literary works, objects, collages, assemblies and Fluxus boxes.

In 1962 he participated in the Festival of Misfits in London and organized the Fluxus Festival Festum Fluxorum in the Nicolai Church in Copenhagen. Up until the mid-60s, Köpcke participated in most of the main Fluxus festivals in Europe (Paris, Düsseldorf, Amsterdam, Scheveningen, Aachen etc.). He settled in Copenhagen at the end of 1957 where he founded Gallery Köpcke, with his Danish wife, Aase ("Tut"). The gallery became a contact point for the international avant-garde movements of Nouveau Realisme and Fluxus in Denmark. 

Köpcke died in Copenhagen in 1977.

Further reading
Arthur Köpcke. Bilder und Stücke. Cat. Texts by H. Christiansen, Joh. Cladders, Thomas Kellein, Per Kirkeby, Emmett Williams. Berlin 1988
Arthur Köpcke. begreifen erleben. Gesammelte Schriften. Collected writings. Ed. by Barbara Wien. Berlin, Stuttgart/London, Köln 1994
Arthur Köpcke. WAS IST DAS - piece No 2. CD (Köpcke lecture "Was ist das", recorded 1974) & booklet. Ed. of 500 num. copies. Berlin, Moen 1996
Arthur Köpcke. Art is work is art. Cat. (German/Engl.) Kunsthalle Hamburg, Kunstverein für die Rheinlande und Westfalen, Düsseldorf & Kunsthalle Fridericianum Kassel. 2003
Rennert, Susanne. Arthur Köpcke. Grenzgänger. Bilder, Objekte, Fluxusstücke. München 1996
Erró, Fahlström, Köpcke, Lebel. PhönixArt 2003. Cat. (German/Engl.). Ed by Claus Mewes. Hamburg 2003

References

Fluxus
Neo-Dada